San Piero a Sieve is a frazione of the comune (municipality) of Scarperia e San Piero, located in the Metropolitan City of Florence, in Tuscany, Italy, about  north of Florence. It was an independent comune until 1 January 2014.

Main sights
Pieve of San Pietro. It houses a baptismal font from the house of Giovanni della Robbia (c. 1508)
Church of San Niccolò a Spugnole
Medici fortress of San Martino

The Medici Villa del Trebbio is located within the territory of San Piero.

References

External links 

Cities and towns in Tuscany
Scarperia e San Piero
Frazioni of the Province of Florence